The Guinea Pig Club, established in 1941, was a social club and mutual support network for British and allied aircrew injured during World War II. Its membership was made up of patients of Archibald McIndoe in Ward III at Queen Victoria Hospital, East Grinstead, Sussex, who had undergone experimental reconstructive plastic surgery, including facial reconstruction, generally after receiving burns injuries in aircraft. The club remained active after the end of the war, and its annual reunion meetings continued until 2007.

Name
The name "Guinea Pig" – the rodent species commonly used as a laboratory test subject – was chosen to reflect the experimental nature of the techniques and equipment used for reconstructive work at East Grinstead. The treatment of burns by surgery was in its infancy, and many casualties were suffering from injuries which, only a few years earlier, would have led to certain death. The hospital was nicknamed "the Sty".

Origins

The club was established informally in June 1941 with 39 patients, primarily as a drinking club, and rapidly won McIndoe's endorsement. The members were aircrew patients in Ward III and the surgeons and anaesthetists who treated them. Aircrew members had to be serving airmen who had gone through at least two surgical procedures. By the end of the war the club had 649 members. (643 names are listed on the "Roll of Honour" memorial at Queen Victoria Hospital.)

The original members were Royal Air Force (RAF) aircrew who had severe burns, generally to the face or hands. Most were British but other significant minorities included Canadians, Australians, New Zealanders and by the end of the war Americans, French, Russians, Czechs and Poles. In 1943, a dedicated Canadian wing was built at the hospital, on the initiative of the Royal Canadian Air Force and at Canadian expense. During the Battle of Britain, most of the patients at East Grinstead were fighter pilots, but by the end of the war around 80% of the members were from bomber crews of RAF Bomber Command. A minority of members had suffered non-burns-related injuries (for example, maxillofacial damage incurred in crashes); while another small minority came from army or navy rather than air force backgrounds. A few members even joined the club after the war's end, through injuries sustained in peacetime accidents, as Ward III remained operational until 1948.

Before the war the RAF had made preparations by setting up burns units in several hospitals to treat the expected casualties. At East Grinstead, McIndoe and his colleagues, including Albert Ross Tilley, developed and improved many techniques for treating and reconstructing burns victims. They had to deal with very severe injuries: one man, Air Gunner Les Wilkins, lost his face and hands and McIndoe recreated his fingers by making incisions between his knuckles.

Aware that many patients would have to stay in hospital for several years and undergo many reconstructive operations, MacIndoe set out to make their lives relaxed and socially productive. He gave much thought to the reintegration of patients into normal life after treatment, an aspect of care that had previously been neglected. They were encouraged to lead as normal a life as possible, including being permitted to wear their own clothes or service uniforms instead of "convalescent blues", and to leave the hospital at will. Local families were encouraged to welcome them as guests, and other residents to treat them without distinction: East Grinstead became "the town that didn't stare". The Guinea Pig Club was part of these efforts to make life in hospital easier, and to rebuild patients psychologically in preparation for life outside. There were even barrels of pale ale in the wards – partly in the interests of re-hydrating patients whose injuries had left them dangerously dehydrated, but also to encourage an informal and happy atmosphere.

Later, many of the men also served in other capacities in RAF operations control rooms, and occasionally as pilots between the surgeries. Those unable to serve in any capacity received full pay until the last surgical operations and only then were invalided out of the service. McIndoe also later loaned some of his patients money for their re-entry into civilian life.

A club magazine, The Guinea Pig, was first published in April 1944.

Post-war history
The club was not disbanded at the end of the war, but continued to meet for over sixty years, offering practical support and a sense of community to former patients. The Guinea Pig magazine also continued to be published until 2003. Annual meetings at East Grinstead attracted visitors from all over the world. McIndoe had been elected life president at the club's foundation: after his death in 1960, Prince Philip, Duke of Edinburgh, became president. Geoffrey Page was the first chairman; and Tom Gleave served as the first and only Chief Guinea Pig until his death in 1993.

In 2001 (the 60th anniversary of the club's foundation) the members agreed to continue holding their annual reunions at East Grinstead until there were only 50 members left. By 2004, there were 120 survivors; and by 2007 there were 97 (57 in Britain; 40 elsewhere in the world), their ages ranging from 82 to 102.  In the event, 2007 marked the last reunion. It attracted over 60 attendees, but in view of the survivors' age and frailty the decision was then taken to wind the club down. There were believed to be 29 survivors by April 2015, and 17 by November 2016.

Brevet
The club symbol, or "brevet", depicted a guinea pig flanked by oversized RAF "wings". Two artistic renditions were used: the first showed the guinea pig sitting upright and with his ears swept back, perhaps in imitation of a pilot at the controls of his aircraft; while the second showed a more naturalistic guinea pig on all fours.

Anthem
The words to the club anthem were written by Edward "Blackie" Blacksell. They were inspired by the World War I song "Fred Karno's Army", and (like that song) sung to the tune Aurelia by Samuel Sebastian Wesley, best known as the tune of the popular hymn "The Church's One Foundation". The final line of the second verse is an example of a mind rhyme.

Legacy

Sixteen members of the club wrote books about their experiences, some of them during the war. The best known, and most influential in raising public awareness of McIndoe's work, was Richard Hillary's The Last Enemy, originally published in the United States as Falling Through Space (1942).

One of the pubs in East Grinstead adopted the name "The Guinea Pig". It closed in 2008 and was demolished in 2009 to make way for a social housing development named Guinea Pig Place.

A painted Roll of Honour is displayed in a corridor of the Canadian Wing at Queen Victoria Hospital.

A bronze monument commemorating McIndoe, sculpted by Martin Jennings (whose own father was a Guinea Pig), was unveiled in East Grinstead High Street in 2014. It depicts a seated airman, with his burned hands clawed together, and his scarred face turned to one side. Behind him, resting a reassuring hand on each shoulder, stands the figure of McIndoe. The two figures are encircled by a stone bench.

In November 2016, a monument honouring members of the club was unveiled by the Duke of Edinburgh, its president, at the National Memorial Arboretum, Staffordshire.

An exhibition in East Grinstead Museum honouring the members of the club was opened in December 2016 by Susan Piper, Lord Lieutenant of West Sussex, with four club members in attendance.

In 2017, the Guinea Pig Club directly inspired the formation of the CASEVAC Club, a similar mutual support group for service personnel badly injured in the Iraq and Afghan wars of the 21st century.

Notable members

George Bennions (1913–2004)
Harold Bird-Wilson (1919–2000)
Robert Boscawen (1923–2013)
Bob Doe (1920–2010)
Jimmy Edwards (1920–1988)
Bill Foxley (1923–2010)
Tom Gleave (1908–1993)
Richard Hillary (1919–1943)
Colin Hodgkinson (1920–1996)
 (1912–1980)
Eric Lock  (1919–1941)
Jackie Mann (1914–1995)
Geoffrey Page (1920–2000)
Richard Pape (1916–1995)
Alois Šiška (1914–2003)
 (1917–1946)
Robert Wright (1906–1992)

Popular culture
Charles MacLean, himself a Guinea Pig, published a novel, The Heavens are not too High, in 1957, telling the story of a fighter pilot who suffers severe burns.

Guinea Pig Club was the title of a play centred on McIndoe's work produced at York Theatre Royal in 2012, featuring Graeme Hawley as McIndoe.

Foyle's War, series 3, episode 2, "Enemy Fire" (2004) features a stately home converted to a burns unit in which the patients are encouraged to drink beer, wear their own clothes and organise entertainment. McIndoe is mentioned in passing.

Joseph Randolph Richard's novel Incendo (2015) tells the story of a badly burned pilot and his membership of the club.

A film entitled The Guinea Pig Club, starring Richard E. Grant as McIndoe, was reported to be planned for production in 2018.

See also
Mollie Lentaigne, a medical artist and nurse at East Grinstead who made drawings of McIndoe's procedures

Bibliography

Memoirs
(Listed in order of date of first publication)

 [revised edition published 1999 as Shot Down in Flames: a World War II fighter pilot's remarkable tale of survival. ]

In addition, The Guinea Pig magazine regularly featured a column "How I became a Guinea Pig", in which individual members recounted their personal experiences.

Secondary accounts

 

 [revised edition published 2018 as The Guinea Pig Club: Archibald McIndoe and the RAF in World War II. ]

References

External links
 The Guinea Pig Club: Jack Toper's Story from the BBC on YouTube
 "War Is a Helluva Teacher" from NPR in 2006
 Hilda Moore, a Canadian nursing sister recounts serving at East Grinstead from Veterans Affairs Canada 
 Interviews and photographs of the Guinea Pig Club from The Guardian

1941 establishments in England
Patients' organizations
Plastic surgery organizations
United Kingdom in World War II
Royal Air Force personnel of World War II
Medical and health organisations based in England
Oral and maxillofacial surgery organizations
Archibald McIndoe
2007 disestablishments in England